William George Oliver is a Canadian politician, who was elected to the Legislative Assembly of New Brunswick in the 2014 provincial election. He represents the electoral district of Kings Centre as a member of the Progressive Conservatives.

Oliver served as a Minister in the Higgs administration. He was re-elected in the 2018 and 2020 provincial elections.

References

Living people
Progressive Conservative Party of New Brunswick MLAs
People from Kings County, New Brunswick
21st-century Canadian politicians
Members of the Executive Council of New Brunswick
Year of birth missing (living people)
Speakers of the Legislative Assembly of New Brunswick